Sertularia gracillima is a hydrozoa described by VS Bale in  1926. Sertularia gracillima is in the genus Sertularia and family sertulariidae.

References 

Sertulariidae